Parliamentary elections were held in Egypt on 3 July 1957, having originally been scheduled for November 1956, but postponed due to the Suez Crisis. The first since the 1952 revolution, which saw King Farouk overthrown, and the approval of a new constitution in a referendum in June 1956, the election was carried out on a non-partisan basis, although nearly 50% of candidates were rejected by army officials for being "undesirable" or "unworthy". They were also the first elections in Egypt in which women had the right to vote or stand for election. Despite only six women contesting the election out of a total of over 2,000 candidates, and 70% of Egyptian men being against their presence in parliament, Rawya Ateya and Amina Shukri were elected, becoming the first women parliamentarians in the Arab world.

Following its election, the 350-member National Assembly was seated on 22 July. However, it had little power, with its votes against government policy being ignored by President Gamal Abdel Nasser. The Assembly was dissolved on 10 February 1958 following Egypt and Syria merging to form of the United Arab Republic, and the establishment of a joint National Assembly with 400 members from Egypt and 200 from Syria.

References

Elections in Egypt
Egypt
Parliamentary election
Non-partisan elections
Egypt
Election and referendum articles with incomplete results